NHRC may refer to:
 National Human Rights Commission of India, a statutory body established in 1993, under the provisions of The Protection of Human Rights Act, 1993 (TPHRA)
 Myanmar National Human Rights Commission, Burma's (Myanmar) independent national human rights commission
 National Human Rights Commission (Nepal), Nepal's independent human rights commission
 New Haven Rowing Club, a rowing club on the Housatonic River in Oxford, Connecticut, United States of America